The 2018–19 Southern Counties East Football League season was the 53rd in the history of the Southern Counties East Football League, a football competition in England, and the third year the competition has two divisions, the Premier Division and Division One.

The provisional club allocations for steps 5 and 6 were announced by the FA on 25 May. These are subject to ratification by the league at its AGM on 23 June.

Premier Division

The Premier Division consisted of 17 clubs from the previous season along with three new clubs, promoted from Division One:
 Fisher
 K Sports
 Punjab United

League table

Results

Division One

Division One consisted of 14 clubs from the previous season along with four new clubs:
 Rochester United, relegated from the Premier Division
 Greenways, promoted from the Kent County League
 Kennington, promoted from the Kent County League
 Welling Town, joined from Kent County League Division Two West

League table

Results

References

External links
 Southern Counties East Football League Official Website

2018–19
9